The New Dress is a 1911 American short silent drama film directed by D. W. Griffith, starring Wilfred Lucas and featuring Blanche Sweet.

Cast
 Wilfred Lucas as Jose
 Dorothy West as Marta
 W. Chrystie Miller as The Father
 Vivian Prescott as The Painted Woman
 Mack Sennett
 Blanche Sweet as At Wedding / At Market
 Kate Toncray as At Wedding / At Market
 Charles West as At Wedding / At Cafe (as Charles H. West)

See also
 D. W. Griffith filmography
 Blanche Sweet filmography

References

External links

1911 films
1911 short films
American silent short films
Biograph Company films
American black-and-white films
1911 drama films
Films directed by D. W. Griffith
Silent American drama films
1910s American films
1910s English-language films
English-language drama films
American drama short films